FK Budućnost Krušik 2014 is a football club based in Valjevo, Serbia. They compete in the Serbian League West, the third tier of the national league system.

History
The club was formed in July 2014 as a result of a merger between two Valjevo clubs, FK Budućnost and FK Krušik. They spent the first seven seasons in the Serbian League West, before suffering relegation to the Kolubara-Mačva Zone League in 2021. The club quickly recovered and returned to the third tier the next year as champions.

Honours
Kolubara-Mačva Zone League (Tier 4)
 2021–22

Managerial history

References

External links
 Club page at Srbijasport

2014 establishments in Serbia
Association football clubs established in 2014
Football clubs in Serbia
Sport in Valjevo